The 2003 Proximus Diamond Games was a women's professional tennis tournament played on indoor s at the Sportpaleis in Antwerp, Belgium that was part of the Tier II category of the 2003 WTA Tour. It was the second edition of the tournament and was held from 10 February until 16 February 2002. First-seeded Venus Williams won her second consecutive singles title at the event and earned $93,000 first-prize money.

Finals

Singles

 Venus Williams defeated  Kim Clijsters, 6–2, 6–4

Doubles

 Kim Clijsters /  Ai Sugiyama defeated  Nathalie Dechy /  Émilie Loit, 6–2, 6–0

External links
 ITF tournament edition details
 Tournament draws

Proximus Diamond Games
Diamond Games
2003 in Belgian tennis
2003 in Belgian women's sport